Tsiigehtchic ("mouth of the iron river"), officially the Charter Community of Tsiigehtchic, is a Gwich'in community located at the confluence of the Mackenzie and the Arctic Red Rivers, in the Inuvik Region of the Northwest Territories, Canada. The community was formerly known as Arctic Red River, until 1 April 1994. The Gwichya Gwich'in First Nation is located in Tsiigehtchic.

Demographics 

In 2016, 130 people identified as First Nations and 10 as Inuit. However, only 5 people said that an Indigenous language (Gwich’in) was their mother tongue.

Transportation 
The Dempster Highway, NWT Highway 8, crosses the Mackenzie River at Tsiigehtchic.
During winter, vehicle traffic is over the ice, during the rest of the year, traffic is carried by the ferry MV Louis Cardinal.

The ferry stops at Tsiigehtchic, on the eastern bank of the Arctic Red River, and on the southwestern and northeastern banks of the Mackenzie River, connecting the two legs of the Dempster Highway. The community is one of the few in the NWT not to be served by a permanent airport.

Steppe bison carcass
In early September 2007, near Tsiigehtchic, local resident Shane Van Loon discovered a carcass of a steppe bison, which was radiocarbon dated to c. 13,650 cal BP. This carcass appears to represent the first Pleistocene mummified soft tissue remains from the glaciated regions of northern Canada (Zazula et al. 2009).

See also
Arctic Red River Water Aerodrome
 List of municipalities in the Northwest Territories

References

Further reading

Tsiigehtchic, N.W.T.: Gwich'in Social and Cultural Institute, 2001.

External links
Tsiigehtchic at the Gwich'in Social and Cultural Institute

Charter communities in the Northwest Territories
Communities in the Inuvik Region
Gwichyaa Gwichʼin
Populated places in Arctic Canada